Ahmad ibn Umar ibn Alī, known as Nizamī-i Arūzī-i Samarqandī  and also Arudi ("The Prosodist"), was a Persian poet and prose writer who flourished between 1110 and 1161. He is particularly famous for his Chahar Maqala ("Four Discourses"), his only work to fully survive. While living in Samarqand, Abu’l-Rajaʾ Ahmad b. ʿAbd-Al-Ṣamad, a dehqan in Transoxiana, told Nezami of how the poet Rudaki was given compensation for his poem extolling the virtues of Samanid Amir Nasr b. Ahmad.

Life 
A native of Samarqand in Transoxiana, his date of birth and death is uncertain. He was most likely born at the end of the 11th century. What is little known of his life can only be found in his book Chahar Maqala. He spent most of his time in Khorasan and Transoxiana, and served as a court-poet to the Ghurids for 45 years. In 1110/1, he was at Samarqand, where he gathered material about the Persian poet Rudaki (d. 941). In 1112/3, he met Omar Khayyam and al-Isfizari at a banquet in Balkh. In 1115/6, he resided in Herat. The following year, he lived in poverty in Nishapur, and thus went to Tus with the goal of gaining the favour of the Seljuk prince Ahmad Sanjar, who governed Khorasan. There he visited the tomb of the Persian poet Ferdowsi, and gathered material regarding him. He also met Mu'izzi, a poet laureate of the Seljuks, who helped him progress his career in poetry. With the help of the latter, Nizami succeeded in gaining the attention of Sanjar. In 1120/1, he was told about the story of Ferdowsi and the Ghaznavid sultan Mahmud by Mu'izzi. In 1136, he went back to Nishapur and visited the tomb of Omar Khayyam. Nizami accompanied the Ghurid ruler Ala al-Din Husayn in his war against Sanjar, and after the former's defeat at a battle near Herat in 1152/3, he hid himself in the city for a period. Nizami most likely composed the Chahar Maqala a few years later (in 1156), which he dedicated to the Ghurid prince Abu'l-Hasan Husam al-Din Ali. The rest of Nizami's life is obscure, he may have studied astrology and medicine.

Works 
Nizámí-i'Arúdí’s The Chahár Maqála, or Four Discourses, is a book consisting of four discourses on four different professionals that Nizami believed a king needs to have in his palace; in the preface of the book, Nizami discusses the philosophical or religious ideology of the creation of the world and the order of things. While he was primarily a courtier, he noted in his book that he was an astronomer and physician as well.<ref>Nizami Aruzi, A Revised Translation of the Chahár maqála ("Four discourses"), xi, 74, 96.</ref> He reports in the work that he spent time not only in his native Samarqand, but also in Herat, Tus (where he visited Ferdowsi's tomb and gathered material on the great poet), Balkh, and Nishapur, where he lived for perhaps five years. He also claimed to have studied under the astronomer-poet Omar Khayyám, a native of Nishapur.

In the introduction to the Chahar Maqala, Aruzi elaborates on issues of Natural Science, epistemology and politics. An identifying feature of Nizámí-i'Arúdí’s writing is the preface, "On Cosmography", is the extensive use of double balance sentences that gives the impression of belief in binary oppositions, or juxtaposition of two opposite things in everything. Also Nizámí-i'Arúdí’s scholastic Islamic ideology holds that a langue or a kind of metanarrative keeps things in order and is surrounded by smaller objects. This langue is God, who is ever-existent. He is a champion of the ancient Persian concept of kingship which, for the sake of legitimation, is expressed in Muslim vocabulary. His elaboration on the classes of society is influenced by Persian as well as Greek conceptions, especially those of Plato.

The Chahar Maqala'' has been translated into several languages, such as English, French, Swedish, Turkish, Urdu, Russian and Arabic.

See also

Persian Literature
List of Persian poets and authors

References

Sources
 .
 
 

12th-century Persian-language poets
Year of birth missing
Year of death missing
Ghurid-period poets
12th-century Iranian people
Poets from the Seljuk Empire
People from Samarkand